Vidas cruzadas is a Mexican telenovela produced by Televisa for Telesistema Mexicano in 1963.

Cast 
Carlos Ancira
Carlos Andremar
Anita Blanch
Eva Calvo
Josefina Escabedo
Pepito Fernandez
Raúl Meraz
María Rivas
Adriana Roel
Guillermo Zetina

References

External links 

Mexican telenovelas
1963 telenovelas
Televisa telenovelas
1963 Mexican television series debuts
1963 Mexican television series endings
Spanish-language telenovelas